Flower power is a slogan.

Flower Power may also refer to:

Art
"Flower Power" (photograph), 1967 photograph by Bernie Boston

Television
 "Flower Power", a live-action episode of The Super Mario Bros. Super Show!
 "Flower Power", an episode of the sitcom The King of Queens
 "Flower Power", an episode of The Backyardigans

Music

Albums
Flower Power (The Flower Kings album), 1999 
Flower Power (Callalily album), 2012
Flower Power, 1985 Sony Japan album by Takako Shirai

Songs
"Flower Power", 1967 CBS debut single of Mud (band)
"Flower Power", Ibiza dance instrumental by the duo Flower Power (Andrea Jeannin and Stefano Mazzacani), adapted as "You Won't Forget About Me" by Dannii Minogue
"Flower Power" (song), 2012, by Girls' Generation
 "Flower Power", a song by John Scofield from the 1990 album Time on My Hands
 "Flower Power", a song by Zazie from the 2007 album Totem

Other uses
 "Flower Power", the personal brand of Canadian hockey player Guy Lafleur

See also

Flower Plower, an album by the band Poster Children
 "Power Flower", a song by Stevie Wonder from the 1979 album Stevie Wonder's Journey Through "The Secret Life of Plants"
Power flower, an item in the video game Super Mario 64 DS